Robert S. McCoig (1937–1998) was a Scottish badminton player who won numerous national and international titles from the late 1950s to the mid-1970s. 

McCoig captured a record fifteen Scottish National singles titles, as well as several Scottish Open singles titles, his greatest international victories came in doubles. He was especially successful in three North American forays which yielded a pair of U.S. Open men's doubles titles (1963, 1965), a pair of Canadian Open men's doubles titles (1963, 1969), and the mixed doubles title of each nation in 1965. With Muriel Woodcock (née Ferguson) McCoig was runner-up in mixed doubles at the prestigious All-England Championships in 1968. He represented Scotland in seven consecutive Thomas Cup (men's international team) campaigns from 1957 to 1976.

References 

Scottish male badminton players
Commonwealth Games bronze medallists for Scotland
Badminton players at the 1966 British Empire and Commonwealth Games
1937 births
1998 deaths
Commonwealth Games medallists in badminton
Medallists at the 1966 British Empire and Commonwealth Games